Bokèo (Laotian: ບໍ່ແກ້ວ ; literally 'gem mine'; previously, Hua Khong, meaning 'head of the Mekong') is a northern province of Laos. It is the smallest and least populous province in the country. Bokeo province borders Luang Namtha province to the northeast, Oudomxai province to the east, Xaignabouli province to the south, and Thailand to the southwest and Burma to the west and northwest. The province has five districts: (Houay Xay, Tonpheung, Meung, Phaodom, and Paktha). It is rich in deposits of precious and semiprecious stones. Bokeo's provincial capital is Houayxay on the Mekong River. The province is in the Golden Triangle, at the border of Myanmar and Thailand. There are 34 ethnic groups in the province. Houay Xay is the border town with Thailand and regional economic centre.

History
Bokeo was named after the sapphires mined in Houayxay District. A stele that is dated 1458 is found in the Wat Jom Kao Manilat, a pagoda built in 1880 of teak in Shan architectural style. Fort Carnot, a historical artifact of the French colonial empire, now belongs to the Lao Army.

The province was created in 1983, when it was split off from Luang Namtha province. In 1992, Paktha and Pha Oudom Districts were reassigned from Oudomxay province. In the past, Houayxay town was a marked crossroad trading centre between Yunnan province of China and Thailand, particularly for Chinese goods.

Geography
Bokeo province borders Luang Namtha province to the northeast, Oudomxay province to the east, Sainyabuli province to the south, Thailand to the southwest, and Burma to the west and northwest. Notable settlements include Houayxay, Mong Lin, Ban Thakate, Ban Meung Hong, Ban Ha Li Tai, Ban Khai San, Ban Nam Kueng, Ban Long and Ban Paung. The Nam Nga River flows through the province's Bokeo Nature Reserve,  and is hemmed between the Mekong River bordering Thailand and Burma and is also on the trade route with China. Don Sao is an island in Tonpheung District, which is connected to the mainland except during the rainy season.

Protected areas
The Bokeo Nature Reserve was created as protection for the black crested gibbon (also known as "black-cheeked gibbon"), discovered in 1997, previously thought to be extinct. Elephants and wild water buffalo migrate through the reserve; bears and tigers are also present. The protected area, is characterized by a mixed deciduous forest and mountainous terrain (elevation ranging between 500 and 1500 m). The area covered by the reserve is 136,000 ha, including 66,000 ha in Bokeo province and 70,000 ha in Luang Namtha province where critically endangered species of western black crested gibbon (Nomascus concolor) is the primary protected species. According to a preliminary survey, the number of gibbons is substantial, particularly in and around the uninhabited Nam Kan River and its tributaries. The project is being supported by the French entrepreneur Jean Francois Reumaux as a Gibbon Experience Project. Gibbon Experience is a conservation project that came into existence after the indigenous black-cheeked gibbon was discovered. The conservation programme has two components: one is of gibbon viewing huts, known as canopy huts (there are four such very large huts) in the forest reserve meant to view the black cheeked gibbons and the second component is to experience the rain forest at canopy level. The Waterfall Gibbon Experience involves three hours of hiking to the location, deep in the reserve following the Nam Nga River.

Other than gibbons, wildlife in the reserve reported are: great barbet (Megalaima virens); grey-headed parakeet (Psittacula finschii); grey leaf monkeys (Semnopithecus); crab-eating mongoose (Herpestes urva), tiger (Panthera tigris); smaller cats; dhole (Cuon alpinus), bears (two types); otters; sambar (Cervus unicolor); and wild cattle (gaur).

The 10,980 hectare Upper Lao Mekong Important Bird Area (IBA) stretches across the provinces of Bokeo, Oudomxay, and Sainyabuli. The topography features river channels, exposed beds, sandbars, sand and gravel bars, islands, rock outcrops, bushland, and braided streams. Confirmed avifauna include black-bellied tern (Sterna acuticauda), great cormorant (Phalacrocorax carbo), grey-headed lapwing (Vanellus cinereus), Jerdon's bush chat (Saxicola jerdoni), brown-throated martin (Riparia paludicola), river lapwing (Vanellus duvaucelii), small pratincole (Glareola lactea), and swan goose (Anser cygnoides).

Administrative divisions
The province includes the following districts:

Demographics
Its population was 179,243 in 2015, in 36 townships, and more than 400 villages. With 34 ethnic groups (including Akha, Hmong, Khamu, Kalom, Kui, Lamet, Lao Huay, Mien, Musoe, Ngo, Phai, Phu Thai, Phuan, Phuvan, Samtao, Shan, Tahoy, Thai Daeng, Thai Dam, Thai Khao, Thai Lu, Thai Nai, and Chinese), the province's ethnic diversity is ranked second in the country, after Luang Namtha province. Most numerous though are the Lanten, Hmong, Lahu, Yao, Akha, and Tai Lue peoples. The Lahu, a Tibeto-Burman speaking people who are part of ethnic group of northern Myanmar and Thailand also inhabit this province in large numbers.

Economy
The provincial economy is now dominated by the Golden Triangle Special Economic Zone (GT SEZ). In 2007, Kings Romans Group, owned by well-connected Chinese husband and wife Zhao Wei and Su Guiqin, entered into a 99-year lease for 10,000 hectares on the banks of the Mekong. The company was granted 3,000 of these hectares as a duty-free zone, now the SEZ. As gambling is illegal in China, and the SEZ is only a two-hour journey by road from China, casinos and hotels catering to a Chinese clientele were built. A robust industry involving trafficking in endangered animals has grown up around the Chinese tourist trade. In January 2018, the US Treasury Department announced sanctions against what it called Zhao's transnational criminal organisation, engaging in illicit activities, including human trafficking and child prostitution, drug trafficking and wildlife trafficking.

See main page at Golden Triangle Special Economic Zone

Houayxay, the capital city of the province, has most of the remainder of the province's economic activity. The province is one of the main maize producing areas of Laos. Commercial mining for precious stones and gold is a major economic activity. Buhae Industrial Corp., which mines for sapphires, is a major company operating in Houayxay District. Many of the ethnic Lantaen villages are noted for their production of traditional saa paper and other crafts.

Paa beuk, a catfish, the largest freshwater fish in the world, is found in the Mekong River. It is an economic resource as it commands a high market price. The flesh of this endangered fish is considered a delicacy.

Landmarks
There are several temples in the capital city of Houayxay, including Wat Chamkao Manilat, Wat Jom Khao Manilat (constructed in 1880), Wat Thadsuvanna Pkakham (with eight gilded Buddhas), Wat Khonekeo Xaiyaram (with red, gold, and green doors and pillars), and Wat Keophone Savanthanaram (with a reclining Buddha behind chicken wire)  The buildings and barracks of the old French Fort Carnot are now destroyed.

Gallery

References

Sources
 
 
   
 
 
 
 
 

 
Populated places on the Mekong River
Provinces of Laos